Foreman School District is a public school district based in Foreman, Arkansas, United States. The Foreman School District provides early childhood, elementary and secondary education for more than 500 kindergarten through grade 12 students at its five facilities. Foreman School District is accredited by the Arkansas Department of Education (ADE).

Schools 
In 2012, Foreman High School was nationally recognized with the Silver Award in the U.S. News & World Report Best High Schools ranking report as the No. 12 school in the state and No. 1,617 in the nation. The high school has been accredited by AdvancED since 1964.

The district's two facilities include:

 Foreman High School—grades 7 through 12.
 Oscar Hamilton Elementary School—kindergarten through grade 6.

See also 

 Ashdown School District, also located in Little River County, Arkansas

References

External links 
 

School districts in Arkansas
Education in Little River County, Arkansas